These are The Official Charts Company Official UK Dance Chart number one hits of 2004. The dates listed in the menus below represent the Saturday after the Sunday the chart was announced, as per the way the dates are given in chart publications such as the ones produced by Billboard, Guinness, and Virgin.

See also
2004 in British music

United Kingdom Dance Singles
2004 in British music
2004